Hal Dresner (June 4, 1937 – March 17, 2023) was an American screenwriter. He worked on such films as The Eiger Sanction, Zorro, The Gay Blade, and Sssssss. He is credited with writing the line, "What we have here is a failure to communicate" for the film Cool Hand Luke. He died of cancer in Ashland, Oregon on March 17, 2023, at the age of 85.

References

External links
 

1937 births
2023 deaths
American male screenwriters
People from New York City
Deaths from cancer in Oregon